Nacharam is a neighbourhood of Hyderabad in the Indian state of Telangana. It falls under Uppal Mandal. It forms Ward No. 6 of Greater Hyderabad Municipal Corporation.

Demographics of Nacharam 
Telugu is the Local Language here. Hindi and English are also spoken and understood by most people.

Transportation

Rail 
Moula Ali Railway Station, Malkajgiri Junction Railway Station are the nearby railway station to Nacharam. Secunderbad Junction Railway station is at a distance of 8.5  km which connects to all major cities in India. Sithaphalmandi station is the closest station connecting to the MMTS service.

Local bus 
Nacharam Bus Station, Nacharam Industrial Area Bus Station, and H.M.T Nagar Bus Station are the three bus stations that are served by TSRTC buses of series 3HN, 3N, 3KN, 6H, 250, 49M/250, 250C, 250S, and 17HN.

Metro 
The closest Metro station is the Habsiguda Metro Station of the Corridor 3 of the Hyderabad Metro Rail which is 1 km away.

Auto-rickshaw 
Several auto-rickshaw serve the area. Share-autos run from Habsiguda to Mallapur via Nacharam and Habsiguda to Chilka Nagar via Nacharam.

Areas of Nacharam 
Bapuji Nagar, H.M.T Nagar, Baba Nagar, Annapurna Colony, Snehapuri Colony, Raghavendra Nagar, Karthikeya Nagar, Durga Nagar, New Raghavendra Nagar, Industrial Development Area, Sri Sai Nagar, Hema Nagar, and several other colonies.

Economy 
Nacharam is famous for its shoe factories and numerous shoe retailers along the Nacharam Main Road. TSIIC Nacharam Industrial Development Area houses numerous small scale industries working on fabrication, clothing exports, tyres, rubber material, and furniture.

After the advent of the IT industry in the city, and from 2000 the area has undergone some commercial development along the Main road which otherwise had mostly the footwear outlets. More recently, SPAR has opened its outlet in Paradise Mall near H.M.T Nagar. Reliance Digital, Heritage Fresh, Bajaj Electronics have all opened their showrooms in the last decade.

Nacharam being area with industrial buzz has several banks having branches to facilitate operation. S.B.I (3 branches), Andhra Bank, H.D.F.C Bank, Laxmi Vilas Bank, Syndicate Bank, Axis Bank, Bank of India, Oriental Bank of Commerce, Indian Overseas Bank, D.C.B Bank, Bank of Baroda, Indian Bank, Cosmos Bank, Canara Bank, Vijaya Bank. Other banks like I.D.B.I bank, Punjab National Bank, Corporation Bank, Telangana State Co-operative Bank, Central Bank of India have branches within 2 km from Nacharam.

Religious places 
H.M.T Nagar Sri Venkateshwara Swamy temple is famous in the neighborhood. Sri Anjaneya Swamy Temple, Goddess Kali Temple, Mahakali Temple near the police station and several other temples are present in the locality. A Major Mosque Masjid-e-Bilal is present in H.M.T Nagar which is frequently visited by many Muslims. St Pius X Church, at bhavani nagar is the nearest catholic church. Several other churches have sprung recently in the area.

Entertainment 
Vyjayanthi Cinema has served the area for the past decade. SPI Cinemas S2 Cinemas have recently opened their presence in Hyderabad by opening Noma Talkies with four screens in Mallapur, a sub-locality in Nacharam.

Food 
Numerous eateries selling tiffins are present all-around the area. Suprabhat Tiffins, Vaibhav Tiffins, Hotel Chandra Grand, Goodlands, Ghungroo Bar and restaurant are some serviced restaurants. Several liquor shops are present in the locality. K.F.C, Pizza Hut, Domino's have all come up in recent years owing to the growing population in the area.

Hospitals 
Chandamama Multispeciality Hospital, Bapuji Hospital, Shree Pooja Hospital Prasads Hospital, E.S.I.C Hospital, Laxmi Nursing Home, Prasad Hospital and several other small hospitals serve the area. Several medical shops are present in the area with many serving 24x7.

Schools and colleges
St. Mathews High School, Prathibha High School, Johnson Grammar School (CBSE, ICSE, SSC), Delhi Public School, St. Peters Model High School. Suprabhat High School, Kamala Memorial School, S.R. Digi School, Noble School are some major schools. Many other smaller schools are present throughout the area.

St. Pious X Degree & PG college for women is the nearest higher educational institute in the area.

Politics 
TRS, BJP, INC , TDP are the major political parties in this area.

Polling stations/booths near Nacharam 

 M P C P S New Building Boys Uppal Kalan 
 Kalyanpuri Community Hall 
 St. Theresa High School Arul Nagar Kapra 
 St.angels High School Babanagar Nacharam 
 Kamala Memorial High School Nacharam

References 

Neighbourhoods in Hyderabad, India
Municipal wards of Hyderabad, India